Iulian Bălan (15 July 1949 – 24 January 2005) was a Romanian footballer who played as a forward. He was "U" Craiova's top-goalscorer with 19 goals when the team won the 1973–74 Divizia A, which was the first trophy in the club's history.

Honours
Universitatea Craiova
Divizia A: 1973–74

References

External links
Iulian Bălan at Labtof.ro

1949 births
2005 deaths
Romanian footballers
Association football forwards
Liga I players
Liga II players
CS Universitatea Craiova players
FC Petrolul Ploiești players
CSM Jiul Petroșani players